The E-1 Treaty Trader Visa allows an individual to enter and work inside of the United States based on an commerce he or she will be conducting, while inside the United States. Treaty trader visas are available only to citizens of certain countries, and the company performing the trading must be at least 50% owned by citizens of the same country as the trader the visa is granted to. Persons with the treaty country's nationality must own at least 50% of the enterprise. Additionally, more than 50 percent of the international trade involved must be between the United States and the treaty country.

References

United States visas by type
United States immigration law